Thitarodes variabilis is a species of moth of the family Hepialidae. It was described by Otto Vasilievich Bremer in 1861 and is known from the Russian Far East.

References

External links
Hepialidae genera

Moths described in 1861
Hepialidae
Moths of Japan